John Wittneben (born April 2, 1955) is an American politician in the state of Iowa.

Wittneben was born in Estherville, Iowa. A Democrat, he served in the Iowa House of Representatives from 2011 to 2013 (7th district).

References

1955 births
Living people
People from Estherville, Iowa
American surveyors
Democratic Party members of the Iowa House of Representatives